On a Day of Ordinary Violence, My Friend Michel Seurat... is a Syrian documentary film by the director Omar Amiralay. The film is an elegy to sociologist academic Michel Seurat. Seurat died after being kidnapped by Islamic Jihad, a precursor to Hezbollah, in Lebanon in 1985.

References

1990s French-language films
1996 films
Syrian documentary films
Films directed by Omar Amiralay
1996 documentary films
Documentary films about jihadism